Andalucia (F72) is the second ship of five Spanish-built s, based on the American  design, of the Spanish Navy.

Laid down in July 1969 and launched on 30 March 1971, Andalucia was commissioned into service on 23 May 1974.

All of these Spanish frigates were built to the size of the Knox frigates.

Other units of class 
 
 
 
 

Ships of the Spanish Navy
1971 ships
Baleares-class frigates
Frigates of the Cold War